That Handsome Devil, often shortened to THD, is an American rock band from Brooklyn, New York, by way of Boston, Massachusetts.

The band mixes genres such as rock, funk, jazz, jive, blues, surf, rhythm and blues, reggae, rockabilly, rap, and psychedelic. Their sound has also been described as "equal parts Screamin’ Jay Hawkins, bizarre electronica, creepy hip hop and in-your-face gonzo rock". Gypsy jazz has been used in description of the band while frontman Godforbid describes the band's music as "fringe pop".

History
The band was founded by Godforbid and Jeremy Page. Predating the band's existence, they were both members of the hip hop group Alaskan Fishermen, along with Thirstin' Howl III and Father Time. That Handsome Devil released their first single "Dating Tips" in 2004, which featured the songs "Dating Tips", "How to Get Money", and "Don't Go". In 2006, the band released their eponymous debut EP That Handsome Devil, which included the single "Dating Tips". "Elephant Bones", the fourth track on the album, was featured as a bonus song in Guitar Hero II.

Their first studio album, A City Dressed in Dynamite, was released in 2008 to several positive reviews, being praised by Amplifier Magazine as "a madcap musical frenzy as dizzying as it is dazzling". With music as stylistically varied as their last release, the album expanded on the band's themes of emptiness, drug addiction, materialism, and death, and featured their trademark of dated sound bites from the 1950s.

A portion of "Mexico" was featured in the seventh episode of season four of Weeds, "Yes I Can", before A City Dressed in Dynamite was released.

"Rob the Prez-O-Dent" was featured as a playable track in Rock Band 2. This, along with the appearance of "Elephant Bones" in Guitar Hero II, increased their visibility despite the band never having released a full-length album before

In 2009, their second EP, Enlightenment's For Suckers, was released.

That Handsome Devil went on a national tour named "Hating New People" in the summer of 2010, where they sold small-print discs of previously unreleased singles and covers.

In 2011, That Handsome Devil released their third album, The Heart Goes to Heaven, The Head Goes to Hell, to favorable reviews from fans and critics. The band supported the album with a tour and the launch of an independent website. The album was financed in part by a fundraising effort on project startup service Kickstarter, raising $6,013 after a month.

That Handsome Devil announced their fourth EP, The Jungle Book, in 2012, available for free on their website. The album consists of covers of several songs from the original Disney movie.

In September 2014, That Handsome Devil released the first single, "$=❤", from their forthcoming album. In November, The band released the album Drugs & Guns For Everyone on their YouTube channel.

Band members
 Christian James Oppel – vocals, songwriter
 Jeremy Page – guitar, bass, keyboard, banjo, pedal steel guitar, glockenspiel, percussion, accordion, synthesizer, kazoo, backing vocals, songwriter
 Naoko Takamoto – backing vocals
 Evan Sanders – keyboard, trumpet, trombone
 Jeremy Siegel – bass, backing vocals
 Sam Merrick – drums
 Andy Bauer – drums, percussion, accordion, guitar, backing vocals
 Deflon Sallahr – hype man

Discography

Studio albums
 That Handsome Devil (2006)
 A City Dressed in Dynamite (2008)
 The Heart Goes to Heaven, The Head Goes to Hell (2011)
 Drugs & Guns For Everyone (2014)
 Your Parents Are Sellouts (2021)

EPs

 That Handsome Devil (2006)
 Enlightenment's For Suckers (2009)
 Hating New People (2010)
 The Jungle Book (2012)
 History is a Suicide Note (2017)

Singles
 "Dating Tips/How to Get Money/Don't Go" (2004)
 "Steady and Slow" (2007)
 "Hey White Boy" (2007)
 "Lucky Me" (2008)
 "Mr. Grinch" (2008)
 "Chicken Claw" (2009)
 "Marilyn Loves Heroin" (2009)
 "Disco City" (2009)
 "How to Get More Money (And Not Have to Shoot Somebody)" (2011)

References

External links
MacNeil, Jason (2008) "That Handsome Devil A City Dressed In Dynamite", PopMatters

Alternative hip hop groups
Alternative rock groups from Massachusetts
Musical groups from Boston